Tenkaihō Takayuki (born 14 October 1984 as Takayuki Minami) is a retired sumo wrestler from Tamana, Kumamoto, Japan. He made his professional debut in January 2007, and reached the top division in January 2012. His highest rank was maegashira 8. He won one sandanme championship. He retired in March 2019 to become a coach in the Japan Sumo Association.

Early life and sumo background
Minami began sumo in only his first year of primary school. In middle school he was regular participant in tournaments and came in third place in a Kyūshū wide tournament. In his second year of high school he was in the best eight in a national sumo tournament, and in his third year made the best sixteen in the same national tournament. He continued practicing sumo at Nihon University and was a teammate of later sumo stars Yamamotoyama and Kiyoseumi. Upon graduation he chose to join Onoe stable which was led by former Hamanoshima who went to the same high school and university as Minami had. He also became stablemates with future ōzeki Baruto.

Career
Minami started his professional career with a consistent string of successes, only losing a few bouts in his first several tournaments and winning the sandanme division championship from the low rank of sandanme 92 with a 7–0 record and a playoff win over veteran Kihonoumi. He rose slowly but consistently through the ranks, recording mostly winning records over the next three years. In the November 2010 tournament he had a breakout performance, losing only to future maegashira Yoshiazuma. In a playoff for the makushita division championship, he lost to future sekiwake Myōgiryū.  He again continued to rise slowly but consistently through the ranks, achieving second division jūryō promotion for the July 2011 tournament. He was helped by there being a large number of retirements due to a match-fixing scandal. Upon promotion to the second division he took the ring name of Tenkaihō. It took him only three winning tournaments in the remainder of 2011 to gain promotion to the top division. After battling for three tournaments in the top tier makuuchi he was relegated back to the second division. He managed to be re-promoted three times after that, but was soon demoted again, and became more of a jūryō regular than a makuuchi performer. He was demoted to the makushita division after the May 2016 tournament, scoring only 4–11 at Jūryō 14. He competed in the upper makushita ranks until 2019 but was never able to secure another promotion.

Retirement from sumo
Tenkaihō announced his retirement after the March 2019 tournament. He stayed in sumo as an elder of the Japan Sumo Association with the elder name Hidenoyama (borrowed from the active wrestler Kotoshogiku), and coaches at Onoe stable. In February 2020 he switched to the Otowayama elder name, and in January 2023 he changed to Sanoyama.

Fighting style
Tenkaihō was a yotsu-sumo wrestler who preferred grappling techniques to pushing and thrusting. His favoured grip on his opponent's mawashi or belt was migi-yotsu, a left hand outside, right hand inside position. His most common winning kimarite was a straightforward yori-kiri or force out, which accounted for about half of his career victories.

Personal life
He registered his marriage in September 2015, to a care worker from Anjo, Aichi. Their wedding reception was held in June 2016.

Career record

See also
Glossary of sumo terms
List of past sumo wrestlers
List of sumo elders

References

External links
 

1984 births
Living people
Japanese sumo wrestlers
Nihon University alumni
People from Tamana, Kumamoto
Sumo people from Kumamoto Prefecture